In computer networking, LibVNCServer and LibVNCClient are cross-platform C libraries that enable one to easily implement VNC server or client functionality in an application. Both libraries support version 3.8 of the Remote Framebuffer Protocol, are fully IPv6-conformant and can handle most known VNC encodings. LibVNCClient furthermore supports encrypted connections. Both libraries are GPL-licensed and portable to many different operating systems.

See also 

 x11vnc

References

External links
 

C (programming language) libraries
Cross-platform free software
Free software programmed in C